Changium smyrnioides is a species of flowering plant in the Apiaceae, of the monotypic genus Changium. It is endemic to the Yangtze basin of China.

References
Physiological characteristics, dry matter, and active component accumulation patterns of Changium smyrnioides in response to a light intensity gradient.   

Endemic flora of China
Apioideae
Monotypic Apioideae genera